Mary Engle Pennington (October 8, 1872 – December 27, 1952) was an American bacteriological chemist and refrigeration engineer.

Early life and education
Mary Engle Pennington was born in Nashville, Tennessee; her parents were Henry and Sarah Malony Pennington. Shortly after her birth, her parents moved to Philadelphia to be closer to her mother's Quaker relatives. Her younger sister, Helen, was born in 1878. Mary Pennington demonstrated an early interest in chemistry. She entered the University of Pennsylvania in 1890 and completed the requirements for a B.S. degree in chemistry with minors in botany and zoology in 1892. However, since the University of Pennsylvania did not grant degrees to women at this time, she was given a certificate of proficiency instead of a degree.

Pennington received her Ph.D. from the University of Pennsylvania in 1895. Her thesis was entitled "Derivatives of Columbium and Tantalum." From 1895–96 she was a university fellow in botany at her Alma Mater. She was a fellow in physiological chemistry at Yale in 1897–99, where she did research in physiological chemistry with Dr Lafayette Mendel and Dr Russell Chittenden. In 1898 she founded the Philadelphia Clinical Laboratory. In the same year, she accepted a position with the Women's Medical College of Pennsylvania as director of their clinical laboratory. She also served as a  research worker in the department of hygiene at the University of Pennsylvania from 1898 to 1901, and was a bacteriologist with the Philadelphia Bureau of Health. In her position with the Bureau of Health, she was instrumental in improving sanitation standards for the handling of milk and milk products.

Later life

Pennington died on December 27, 1952, in New York. She is buried at Laurel Hill Cemetery in Philadelphia, Pennsylvania.

Association with the U.S. Department of Agriculture
In 1905, Pennington began working for the U.S. Department of Agriculture as a bacteriological chemist. Her director at the Bureau of Chemistry, Harvey W. Wiley, encouraged her to apply for a position as chief of the newly created Food Research Laboratory, which had been established to enforce the Pure Food and Drug Act of 1906. She accepted the position in 1907. One of her major accomplishments was the development of standards for the safe processing of chickens raised for human consumption.  She also served as head of an investigation of refrigerated boxcar design and served on Herbert Hoover's War Food Administration during World War I.

Refrigeration engineer and consultant
Pennington's involvement with refrigerated boxcar design at the Food Research Laboratory led to an interest in the entire process of transporting and storing perishable food, including both refrigerated transport and home refrigeration. During her time with the laboratory, Pennington and Howard Castner Pierce were awarded a U.S. patent for an all-metal poultry-cooling rack for the cooling and grading of poultry, rabbits, and game. In 1919, Pennington accepted a position with a private firm, American Balsa, which manufactured insulation for refrigeration units.  She left the firm in 1922 to start her own consulting business, which she ran until her retirement in 1952. She founded the Household Refrigeration Bureau in 1923 to educate consumers in safe practices in domestic refrigeration. Much of her work in the 1920s was supported by the National Association of Ice Industries (NAII), an association of independent icemakers and distributors who delivered ice to the home for use in iceboxes, before the widespread availability of electric refrigerators. With NAII support, she published pamphlets on home food safety, including The Care of the Child's Food in the Home (1925) and Cold is the Absence of Heat (1927).

Publications and memberships
She contributed to many scientific and medical journals and was a member of the American Chemical Society and the Society of Biological Chemists. She was a fellow of the American Association for the Advancement of Science, and a member of the Philadelphia Pathological Society, Sigma XI, and the Kappa Kappa Gamma sorority.

Awards
Mary Engle Pennington was the recipient of the Garvan-Olin Medal, the highest award given to women in the American Chemical Society.  She is also an inductee of both the National Women's Hall of Fame and the ASHRAE Hall of Fame. She was the first woman elected to the Poultry Historical Society Hall of Fame in 1959.  In 2018, she was inducted into the National Inventors Hall of Fame.

Further reading

References

Leonard, John William (1914). Woman's who's who of America: a biographical dictionary of contemporary women of the United States and Canada, 1914-1915, The American Commonwealth Company.

External links

Profile at National Women's Hall of Fame

 Alt URL

1872 births
1952 deaths
People from Nashville, Tennessee
Scientists from Philadelphia
American women engineers
American chemical engineers
Women chemists
Food and Drug Administration people